The 2022–23 season is the 117th season in the history of Sporting CP and their 89th consecutive season in the top flight of Portuguese football. In addition to the domestic league, they are participating in this season's editions of the Taça de Portugal, Taça da Liga, UEFA Champions League and UEFA Europa League.

Players

Current squad

Other players under contract

Out on loan

Transfers

In

Summer

Winter

Out

Pre-season and friendlies

Competitions

Overall record

Primeira Liga

League table

Results summary

Results by round

Matches

Taça de Portugal 

Sporting will enter in the third round.

Taça da Liga

Third round

Quarter-finals

Semi-finals

Final

UEFA Champions League

Group stage 

The draw for the group stage was held on 25 August 2022.

UEFA Europa League

Knockout phase

Knockout round play-offs
The Knockout round play-offs draw was held on 7 November 2022.

Round of 16
The Round of 16 draw was held on 24 February 2023.

Quarter-finals
The Quarter-finals draw was held on 17 March 2023.

References

Sporting CP seasons
Sporting CP
Sporting CP